Alexandru "Alex" Bălţoi (born 21 June 1982) is a Romanian former footballer who played as a forward. Bălţoi made his Liga I debut on 4 March 2000 for Dinamo București, in a 1–0 victory against Extensiv Craiova. In his career Alex played for various Romanian clubs, among others: Dinamo București, Farul Constanţa, Oțelul Galați, Argeş Piteşti, UTA Arad, Brașov or Ceahlăul Piatra Neamţ. He also played for a short period in Moldova, for CSCA–Rapid Chişinău. Bălțoi retired in 2017, his last club was Liga III side Atletico Vaslui, where he was also the assistant manager, for a short time.

Trivia
In July 2017 Bălţoi was suspended by the Romanian Football Federation for match fixing attempt, after he sent a message to coach Alin Pânzaru (Dacia Unirea Brăila), suggesting that Brăila should lose at Academica Clinceni. Later, he would say: "That's a stupidity, an aberration. I made an April 1 joke with Alin Pânzaru (coach from Dacia Unirea Brăila). I told him to do this thing, but it was a joke. He took it seriously and went with the SMS to the Federation. I'm innocent. Anyway, I retired from football. Now I do some kinetotherapist classes."

Honours
Dinamo București
Romanian League Championship: 1999–00, 2001–02
Romanian Cup: 1999–00, 2004–05
Romanian Super Cup: 2005

References

External links
 
 

1982 births
Living people
Footballers from Bucharest
Romanian footballers
Association football forwards
Romania under-21 international footballers
Liga I players
Liga II players
FC Dinamo București players
FCM Câmpina players
FCV Farul Constanța players
ASC Oțelul Galați players
FC Argeș Pitești players
FC UTA Arad players
FC Brașov (1936) players
CSM Unirea Alba Iulia players
CSM Ceahlăul Piatra Neamț players
CS Concordia Chiajna players
AFC Dacia Unirea Brăila players
LPS HD Clinceni players
Moldovan Super Liga players
FC Rapid Ghidighici players
Romanian expatriate footballers
Romanian expatriate sportspeople in Moldova
Expatriate footballers in Moldova
FC Unirea Dej players